Alvan Cordell "Hap" Hadley (March 16, 1895 – August 4, 1976) was an American artist specializing in pen and ink representations of popular subjects.  He created posters for various films, including Buster Keaton's The General (1926) and Charlie Chaplin's The Circus (1928), as well as promotional posters for the Ringling Bros. and Barnum & Bailey Circus and billboards for Roy Rogers. A movie poster of The General was sold by Christie's East on December 5, 1994, for $46,000.

He was also an actor, performing in the 1920–21 Broadway revue The Greenwich Village Follies of 1920 at the Shubert Theatre in New York City and the 1924 film Floodgates.

References

External links
"Hap Hadley Posters" at WorthPoint.com, including a fairly detailed biography
"Alvan Hadley - Movie Poster Artist" at vintagemovieposters.com.au

American artists
Film poster artists
American male stage actors
1895 births
1976 deaths